Ricardo Delgado (born 22 February 1994) is a Luxembourger international footballer who plays as a defender for F91 Dudelange.

Career
He made his international debut for Luxembourg in 2015.

Delgado joined F91 Dudelange for the 2019/20 season.

References

1994 births
Living people
Luxembourgian people of Portuguese descent
Luxembourgian footballers
Luxembourg international footballers
Association football defenders
Jeunesse Esch players
F91 Dudelange players
Luxembourg National Division players